Bentinck may refer to:

People:
 Lord William Bentinck (1774-1839), Governor-General of India from 1828 to 1839
 Bentinck family, a prominent family in both Dutch and British nobility, including a list of British family members
 Bernhard Bentinck (1877-1931), English cricketer

Places: 
 County of Bentinck, Queensland, Australia
 Bentinck, Ontario, Canada, a former township
 Bentinck, Derbyshire, England, a village
 Bentinck Township, Bottineau County, North Dakota, United States
 Bentinck Island, Queensland, Australia, part of the South Wellesley Islands
 Bentinck Island, British Columbia, Canada
 Bentinck Kyun (Bentinck Island), Burma

Ships:
 , three Royal Navy ships
 , a World War II destroyer escort renamed and commissioned as USS Brennan 

Other uses:
Bengough Memorial Stakes, a Group 3 flat horse race originally called the Bentinck Stakes
 Bentinck Hotel, setting for the British TV series The Duchess of Duke Street

See also
 North Bentinck Arm, British Columbia, Canada, an inlet